Good Guys or The Good Guys may refer to:

Good guy, a hero
Good guy, a nice guy

Books
 Good Guys (Brust novel), a 2018 novel by Steven Brust
 The Good Guy, a 2007 thriller novel by Dean Koontz
 The Good Guys (comics), a comic book series that was published from 1993 to 1994
 The Good Guys, a novel by Salvatore Bonanno, Joseph Pistone and David Fisher

Film and television
 Good Guys, a brand of murderous dolls from the Child's Play horror film franchise
 Operation Good Guys, a British mockumentary
 The Good Guy (film), a 2009 romantic-comedy film
 The Good Guys (1968 TV series), an American sitcom that ran on CBS from 1968 to 1970
 The Good Guys (British TV series), a British comedy-drama featuring David Langton that ran from 1992 to 1993
 The Good Guys (2010 TV series), an American buddy-cop comedy-drama on Fox that debuted and ended in 2010

Music
 "Good Guy", a 2018 song by Eminem
 Good Guys (album), a 2012 album by Bucky Covington
 "Good Guys", a 2015 song by Mika released as a promotional single
 The Good Guys, a slogan used for disc jockeys on American top-40 radio stations in the 1960s
 WMCA (AM) (New York City)
 WTOB (Winston-Salem, North Carolina)
 WKSN (Jamestown, New York)

Business
 Good Guys (American company), a former chain of consumer electronics retail stores in the United States
 The Good Guys (Australian company), a chain of consumer electronics retail stores in Australia and New Zealand